Ali bin Kmeikh Al-Muraikhi-Al-Mutairi commonly known as Ali Komaikh is a Saudi Arabian former football player who was in 2014 manager of the Jordanian club Shabab Al-Ordon.

Honours

Player

Al-Nassr
Saudi Premier League (2) : 1980, 1981
Saudi King's Cup (1): 1981

Manager

Al-Shoalah
Saudi Second Division (1) : 2008-09

References

External links
 

Living people
Saudi Arabian footballers
Association football defenders
Al Nassr FC players
Saudi Arabian football managers
Al Nassr FC managers
Al-Shoulla FC managers
Expatriate football managers in Jordan
Sportspeople from Riyadh
1960 births
Al-Faisaly SC managers
Saudi Professional League players
Saudi First Division League managers
Al-Hazm FC managers
Al-Fayha FC managers